Arecinae is a palm tree subtribe in the tribe Areceae.

Genera:
 Areca
 Nenga
 Pinanga

References

External links

 
Arecaceae subtribes